In mathematics, a sheaf of O-modules or simply an O-module over a ringed space (X, O) is a sheaf F such that, for any open subset U of X, F(U) is an O(U)-module and the restriction maps F(U) → F(V) are compatible with the restriction maps O(U) → O(V): the restriction of fs is the restriction of f times that of s for any f in O(U) and s in F(U).

The standard case is when X is a scheme and O its structure sheaf. If O is the constant sheaf , then a sheaf of O-modules is the same as a sheaf of abelian groups (i.e., an abelian sheaf).

If X is the prime spectrum of a ring R, then any R-module defines an OX-module (called an associated sheaf) in a natural way. Similarly, if R is a graded ring and X is the Proj of R, then any graded module defines an OX-module in a natural way. O-modules arising in such a fashion are examples of quasi-coherent sheaves, and in fact, on affine or projective schemes, all quasi-coherent sheaves are obtained this way.

Sheaves of modules over a ringed space form an abelian category. Moreover, this category has enough injectives, and consequently one can and does define the sheaf cohomology  as the i-th right derived functor of the global section functor .

Examples 
Given a ringed space (X, O), if F is an O-submodule of O, then it is called the sheaf of ideals or ideal sheaf of O, since for each open subset U of X, F(U) is an ideal of the ring O(U).
Let X be a smooth variety of dimension n.
A sheaf of algebras is a sheaf of module that is also a sheaf of rings.

Operations 
Let (X, O) be a ringed space. If F and G are O-modules, then their tensor product, denoted by
is the O-module that is the sheaf associated to the presheaf  (To see that sheafification cannot be avoided, compute the global sections of  where O(1) is Serre's twisting sheaf on a projective space.)

Similarly, if F and G are O-modules, then

denotes the O-module that is the sheaf . In particular, the O-module

Note: for any O-modules E, F, there is a canonical homomorphism
,
which is an isomorphism if E is a locally free sheaf of finite rank. In particular, if L is locally free of rank one (such L is called an invertible sheaf or a line bundle), then this reads:

implying the isomorphism classes of invertible sheaves form a group. This group is called the Picard group of X and is canonically identified with the first cohomology group  (by the standard argument with Čech cohomology).

If E is a locally free sheaf of finite rank, then there is an O-linear map  given by the pairing; it is called the trace map of E.

For any O-module F, the tensor algebra, exterior algebra and symmetric algebra of F are defined in the same way. For example, the k-th exterior power

is the sheaf associated to the presheaf . If F is locally free of rank n, then  is called the determinant line bundle (though technically invertible sheaf) of F, denoted by det(F). There is a natural perfect pairing:

Let f: (X, O) →(X, O) be a morphism of ringed spaces. If F is an O-module, then the direct image sheaf  is an O-module through the natural map O →f*O (such a natural map is part of the data of a morphism of ringed spaces.)

If G is an O-module, then the module inverse image  of G is the O-module given as the tensor product of modules:

as abelian group. There is also the projection formula: for an O-module F and a locally free O'-module E of finite rank,

Properties 

Let (X, O) be a ringed space. An O-module F is said to be generated by global sections if there is a surjection of O-modules:

Explicitly, this means that there are global sections si of F such that the images of si in each stalk Fx generates Fx as Ox-module.

An example of such a sheaf is that associated in algebraic geometry to an R-module M, R being any commutative ring, on the spectrum of a ring Spec(R).
Another example: according to Cartan's theorem A, any coherent sheaf on a Stein manifold is spanned by global sections. (cf. Serre's theorem A below.) In the theory of schemes, a related notion is ample line bundle. (For example, if L is an ample line bundle, some power of it is generated by global sections.)

An injective O-module is flasque (i.e., all restrictions maps F(U) → F(V) are surjective.) Since a flasque sheaf is acyclic in the category of abelian sheaves, this implies that the i-th right derived functor of the global section functor  in the category of O-modules coincides with the usual i-th sheaf cohomology in the category of abelian sheaves.

Sheaf associated to a module 
Let  be a module over a ring . Put  and write . For each pair , by the universal property of localization, there is a natural map

having the property that . Then

is a contravariant functor from the category whose objects are the sets D(f) and morphisms the inclusions of sets to the category of abelian groups. One can show  it is in fact a B-sheaf (i.e., it satisfies the gluing axiom) and thus defines the sheaf  on X called the sheaf associated to M.

The most basic example is the structure sheaf on X; i.e., . It defines an equivalence from ModA to the category of quasi-coherent sheaves on X, with the inverse , the global section functor. When X is Noetherian, the functor is an equivalence from the category of finitely generated A-modules to the category of coherent sheaves on X.

The construction has the following properties: for any A-modules M, N,
.
For any prime ideal p of A,  as Op = Ap-module.
.
If M is finitely presented, .
, since the equivalence between ModA and the category of quasi-coherent sheaves on X.
; in particular, taking a direct sum and ~ commute.

Sheaf associated to a graded module 
There is a graded analog of the construction and equivalence in the preceding section. Let R be a graded ring generated by degree-one elements as R0-algebra (R0 means the degree-zero piece) and M a graded R-module. Let X be the Proj of R (so X is a projective scheme if R is Noetherian). Then there is an O-module  such that for any homogeneous element f of positive degree of R, there is a natural isomorphism

as sheaves of modules on the affine scheme ; in fact, this defines  by gluing.

Example: Let R(1) be the graded R-module given by R(1)n = Rn+1. Then  is called Serre's twisting sheaf, which is the dual of the tautological line bundle if R is finitely generated in degree-one.

If F is an O-module on X, then, writing , there is a canonical homomorphism:
,
which is an isomorphism if and only if F is quasi-coherent.

Computing sheaf cohomology 

Sheaf cohomology has a reputation for being difficult to calculate. Because of this, the next general fact is fundamental for any practical computation:

Serre's theorem A states that if X is a projective variety and F a coherent sheaf on it, then, for sufficiently large n, F(n) is generated by finitely many global sections. Moreover,
 For each i, Hi(X, F) is finitely generated over R0, and
 (Serre's theorem B) There is an integer n0, depending on F, such that

Sheaf extension 
Let (X, O) be a ringed space, and let F, H be sheaves of O-modules on X. An extension of H by F is a short exact sequence of O-modules

As with group extensions, if we fix F and H, then all equivalence classes of extensions of H by F form an abelian group (cf. Baer sum), which is isomorphic to the Ext group , where the identity element in  corresponds to the trivial extension.

In the case where H is O, we have: for any i ≥ 0,

since both the sides are the right derived functors of the same functor 

Note: Some authors, notably Hartshorne, drop the subscript O.

Assume X is a projective scheme over a Noetherian ring. Let F, G be coherent sheaves on X and i an integer. Then there exists n0 such that
.

Locally free resolutions 
 can be readily computed for any coherent sheaf  using a locally free resolution: given a complex

then

hence

Examples

Hypersurface
Consider a smooth hypersurface  of degree . Then, we can compute a resolution

and find that

Union of smooth complete intersections
Consider the scheme

We have a complex

resolving  which we can use to compute .

See also 
D-module (in place of O, one can also consider D, the sheaf of differential operators.)
fractional ideal
holomorphic vector bundle
generic freeness

Notes

References 

Sheaf theory